Idolatteria mimica is a species of moth of the family Tortricidae. It is found in Peru.

The wingspan is about 23 mm. The ground colour of the forewings is pale orange. The markings are blackish with a slight greenish blue shine. The hindwings are orange with dark brown basal and median parts.

Etymology
The species name refers to the external similarity to members of Pseudatteria and is derived from Latin mimica (meaning imitator).

References

Moths described in 2008
Archipini
Moths of South America
Taxa named by Józef Razowski